Paanchi, a person in the Book of Mormon, was one of the sons of Pahoran who contended for the judgement-seat of the Nephite people. He was executed in about 50 BC for plotting to seize the judgement-seat by violent rebellion.

Possible origin of the name 
Hugh Nibley relates the name to Egypt, and states:

"The first high priest [of the twenty-first dynasty in Egypt] was called Korihor, and his son was called Piankhi - two Book of Mormon names. They have the same relationship in the Book of Mormon. Paanchi is one of the high judges... Piankhi was a very famous name by the time Lehi left Jerusalem. It was a priestly name, and a royal name. Some people say it was Piankhi who founded the twenty-fifth dynasty [of Egypt]; some say it was Shabako."

Mormon scholars have speculated that the presence of the name "Paanchi" in the Book of Mormon indicates that claims of ancient Nubian influence in Pre-Columbian America (specifically, in the time of Nubian King Paanchi) and claims of the Book of Mormon to be an authentic record from ancient America are mutually supportive. If so, that would also mean that some of the Book of Mormon people had African roots. At least three different migrations from the Old World to the Americas are described in the Book of Mormon, and that would imply that there were others that were unknown to the Nephite writers.

See also
Linguistics and the Book of Mormon
Archaeology and the Book of Mormon

References 

Book of Mormon people